The men's doubles tournament at the 1993 US Open was held from August 30 to September 12, 1993, on the outdoor hard courts at the USTA National Tennis Center in New York City, United States. Ken Flach and Rick Leach won the title, defeating Karel Nováček and Martin Damm in the final.

Seeds

  Todd Woodbridge /  Mark Woodforde (third round)
  Patrick McEnroe /  Richey Reneberg (third round)
  Grant Connell /  Patrick Galbraith (second round)
  Jacco Eltingh /  Paul Haarhuis (second round)
  Mark Kratzmann /  Wally Masur (second round)
  Tom Nijssen /  Cyril Suk (third round)
  Luke Jensen /  Murphy Jensen (second round)
  Sergio Casal /  Emilio Sánchez (first round)
  Steve DeVries /  David Macpherson (second round)
  Jared Palmer /  Jonathan Stark (first round)
  Danie Visser /  Laurie Warder (first round)
  Ken Flach /  Rick Leach (champions)
  Glenn Michibata /  David Pate (first round)
  Shelby Cannon /  Scott Melville (first round)
  David Adams /  Andrei Olhovskiy (semifinals)
  Hendrik-Jan Davids /  Piet Norval (second round)

Draw

Finals

Top half

Section 1

Section 2

Bottom half

Section 3

Section 4

External links
 Main draw
1993 US Open – Men's draws and results at the International Tennis Federation

Men's Doubles
US Open (tennis) by year – Men's doubles